Bryce Eric Paup (born February 29, 1968) is an American former professional football player who was an outside linebacker for eleven seasons in the National Football League (NFL) with the Green Bay Packers, Buffalo Bills, Jacksonville Jaguars and the Minnesota Vikings.

Early life
Paup grew up on a farm in Scranton, Iowa, where he played football at Scranton High School.

He played collegiately at the University of Northern Iowa, and was selected by the Packers in the 6th round of the 1990 NFL Draft.

Professional career
In the first game of the 1991 season, Paup was involved in a tackle that sidelined Philadelphia Eagles quarterback Randall Cunningham, ending Cunningham's season. The tackle was below the waist and right at Cunningham's knee which ruined Cunningham's 1991 season. His aggressive physical style led Packers fans to refer to his tackle as “Paup Smear”.

In 1995, his first season with the Buffalo Bills, Paup was named NFL Defensive Player of the Year by the Associated Press. Paup led the NFL with 17.5 sacks, the fourth-highest single-season total of the 1990s. Paup has been considered one of the top 50 players in Bills history. NFL Total Access listed him as one of the Top 10 free agents of all time.

Paup was a four-time Pro Bowl selection.

Coaching career
On March 19, 2007, Paup was introduced as the head football coach at Green Bay Southwest High School.  He compiled a 22-14 regular season record in his first four seasons, and in 2009 secured the second playoff victory in school history. He is also on the Packers' Board of Directors. Prior to accepting the job, he was an assistant volunteer football coach for the De Pere High School Redbirds of De Pere, Wisconsin for three years, working primarily with the linemen and linebackers.

On March 5, 2013, Paup resigned from Green Bay Southwest and began his first season as the defensive line coach at the University of Northern Iowa.

January 14, 2017, Paup was named University of Minnesota's defensive line coach. After one season with the Gophers, Paup left the Minnesota coaching staff, reportedly to pursue a coaching opportunity in the NFL.

In August 2018, he returned to the University of Northern Iowa defensive line coach.

Personal life
Paup lives in Cedar Falls, IA, with his wife Denise. They have six children: Alex, Nathan, Rachel, Hailey, and twins Paige and Lauren.

References

1968 births
Living people
American football defensive ends
American football linebackers
Northern Iowa Panthers football players
Green Bay Packers players
Buffalo Bills players
Jacksonville Jaguars players
Minnesota Vikings players
National Conference Pro Bowl players
American Conference Pro Bowl players
People from Jefferson, Iowa
People from Greene County, Iowa
High school football coaches in Wisconsin
Northern Iowa Panthers football coaches
Minnesota Golden Gophers football coaches
National Football League Defensive Player of the Year Award winners